Belton is a city in northwestern Cass County, Missouri, United States. The population was 23,116 at the 2010 census.

History
Belton was platted in 1871. The city was likely named for surveyor Capt. Marcus Lindsey Belt. A post office called Belton has been in operation since 1872.

Geography
Belton is located in northwest Cass County and is four miles from the Missouri-Kansas border. The city is on Missouri Route 58 west of I-49/U.S. Route 71. Raymore lies four miles to the east, Peculiar is seven miles to the southeast along Route 71 and Grandview is five miles to the north in Jackson County.

Demographics

2010 census
As of the census of 2013, there were 23,175 people, 8,623 households, and 6,083 families living in the city. The racial makeup of the city was 85.7% White, 6.0% African American, 0.6% Native American, 0.9% Asian, 0.1% Pacific Islander, 3.7% from other races, and 3.1% from two or more races. Hispanic or Latino of any race were 8.1% of the population.

There were 8,623 households, of which 39.7% had children under the age of 18 living with them, 49.5% were married couples living together, 15.0% had a female householder with no husband present, 6.0% had a male householder with no wife present, and 29.5% were non-families. 24.3% of all households were made up of individuals, and 8.8% had someone living alone who was 65 years of age or older. The average household size was 2.67 and the average family size was 3.15.

The median age in the city was 33.6 years. 28.2% of residents were under the age of 18; 8.7% were between the ages of 18 and 24; 28.2% were from 25 to 44; 24.3% were from 45 to 64; and 10.8% were 65 years of age or older. The gender makeup of the city was 48.4% male and 51.6% female.

2000 census
As of the census of 2000, there were 21,730 people, 7,945 households, and 5,807 families living in the city.

The racial makeup of the city was 91.95% White, 3.85% Black, 0.60% Native American, 0.58% Asian, 0.09% Pacific Islander, 1.08% from other races, and 1.85% from two or more races. Hispanic or Latino of any race were 4.69% of the population.

There were 7,945 households, out of which 40.6% had children under the age of 18 living with them, 56.0% were married couples living together, 12.9% had a female householder with no husband present, and 26.9% were non-families. 22.3% of all households were made up of individuals, and 7.5% had someone living alone who was 65 years of age or older. The average household size was 2.70 and the average family size was 3.15.

The population was spread out, with 30.0% under the age of 18, 8.6% from 18 to 24, 32.6% from 25 to 44, 18.8% from 45 to 64, and 10.1% who were 65 years of age or older. The median age was 33 years. For every 100 females, there were 93.6 males. For every 100 females age 18 and over, there were 90.1 males.

The median income for a household in the city was $45,581, and the median income for a family was $51,268. Males had a median income of $35,518 versus $25,542 for females. The per capita income for the city was $18,572. About 6.5% of families and 7.9% of the population were below the poverty line, including 10.5% of those under age 18 and 4.1% of those age 65 or over.

Economy

Largest employers
According to the city's 2016 Comprehensive Annual Financial Report, the largest employers in the city are:

Education
Belton School District #124 includes most of Belton. It operates six elementary schools, two middle schools, and Belton High School.

A portion of eastern Belton is in the Raymore-Peculiar School District.

Belton has a public library, a branch of the Cass County Public Library.

Notable people

 Dale Carnegie, author of How to Win Friends and Influence People (parents moved to community when he was adult but he is buried in Belton)
 Emmett Dalton, of the bank-robbing Dalton Gang
 Ben Hardaway, storyboard artist, animator, voice actor, gagman, writer, and director during the Golden Age of American animation.
 Kevin Hern, businessman and member of the U.S. House of Representatives for Oklahoma's 1st congressional district
 Carrie Nation, leader of temperance movement
 Tate Stevens, 2012 winner of The X Factor
 Harry S. Truman, 33rd President of the United States.
 Brad St. Louis, played 10 seasons with the Cincinnati Bengals in the National Football League.

Sister Cities
 Manzanillo, Mexico
 Selkirk, Canada

References

External links

City of Belton
Historic maps of Belton in the Sanborn Maps of Missouri Collection at the University of Missouri

Cities in Cass County, Missouri
Cities in Kansas City metropolitan area
1871 establishments in Missouri
Cities in Missouri